The Nebraska Cornhuskers men's track and field team represents the University of Nebraska in NCAA Division I. The program was established in 1889, making it Nebraska's first varsity sport, and is currently coached by Gary Pepin, who has led Nebraska's women's program since 1980 and men's program since 1983. NU has won 38 indoor conference championships and 29 outdoor conference champions, and has produced 41 combined individual national champions.

Coaches

Coaching history

Coaching staff

NCAA individual champions

References

External links